Events in the year 2018 in Tanzania.

Incumbents
 President: John Magufuli
 Vice-President: Samia Suluhu 
 Prime Minister: Kassim Majaliwa 
 Chief Justice: Ibrahim Hamis Juma

Events

20 September – Sinking of MV Nyerere, 228 deaths

Deaths

23 January – Robert Kisanga, judge (b. 1933).

6 March – Amani W. A. Kabourou, politician (b. 1949)

References

 
2010s in Tanzania
Years of the 21st century in Tanzania
Tanzania
Tanzania